Kamisugi Station may refer to:

 Kamisugi Station (Akita)
 Kamisugi Station (Hiroshima)